William John Nixon (1886–1916) was an English footballer who played for Stoke.

Career
Nixon was born in Stoke-upon-Trent and played football with Trentham before joining Stoke in 1910. He played in two matches towards the 1911–12 season which included a 7–0 win over Millwall Athletic before joining the army at end of the season. He died in France during World War I.

Career statistics

References

English footballers
Stoke City F.C. players
1886 births
1916 deaths
Association football outside forwards
British Army personnel of World War I
British military personnel killed in World War I